Falling in Love is the fifth album by Rachelle Ann Go, released in January 2009. The album, which is composed of revivals, brings Rachelle Ann back to her roots after she experimented with a more upbeat style in her previous album, Rachelle Ann Rocks Live!.

"This is the kind of music that best reflects who I am and where I am right now in my life," says Rachelle Ann. "All the albums that I've done are very special to me, but this one is the most special so far. I think people will understand why."

The new 14-track album contains her revivals of some of the best and most popular love songs of all time, mostly from the 1970s and 80s.
Falling in Love includes "If" by Bread; "Of All the Things" by Dennis Lambert; "I'll Always Love You" by Taylor Dayne; "Somebody Waiting" by Karen Wyman; "I Got Caught Dancing Again" by The Hues Corporation; "If You Don't Know Me by Now" originally by Harold Melvin & the Blue Notes but now better known as a hit by Simply Red; "Didn't We" by Jim Webb; "Let the Pain Remain", a Willy Cruz composition popularized by Basil Valdez; "Traces" by Classics IV, which was also successfully covered by the Lettermen; "This Time I'll Be Sweeter" by Angela Bofill; "You and Me Against the World" by Helen Reddy; "You and I" by Petula Clark from the motion picture Goodbye, Mr. Chips; and the Jerome Kern and Oscar Hammerstein II composition "All the Things You Are".

To date, this album has produced two revival hits, "This Time I'll Be Sweeter" and the OPM piece, "Let the Pain Remain". As of December 13, after eleven months from its release, Falling in Love was awarded the Gold Certification by VIVA Music and PARI for outstanding sales of more than 15,000 units.

Track listing

Personnel

 Vic del Rosario Jr. - executive producer
 Tony Ocampo - executive producer
 Vincent del Rosario - executive producer
 Eugene Villaluz - album producer
 Baby A. Gil - supervising producer
 MG O. Mozo - supervising producer
 Guia Gil-Ferrer - associate producer 
 Joel Mendoza - recorded, mixed & mastered at Amerasian Studios
 Paul Basinillo - creative director
 Denim Inc. - concept & design
 Mia Marigomen - concept & design
 Jay Mongado - concept & design
 Grace Castaneda - concept & design
 Dittle - concept & design
 Sara Black - photography
 Bem Abeleda - hair & make-up
 Janet dela Fuente - styling

Acknowledgements

 Black Tube Dress by: Eric delos Santos
 Embellished Purple & Black Dress by: Tina Daniac
 Silver Gray Dress by: Joel Escober
 Gray Haltered Dress by: Eric delos Santos
 Accessories by: Victoria Marin (Greenbelt 5)
 Special Thanks to Lawrence Cua of Bench & Charles & Keith

References

2009 albums
Rachelle Ann Go albums